"Fixing a Broken Heart" is a song by the Australian pop group Indecent Obsession. It was the first single released from their third studio album, Relativity (1993). Two versions of the song exist: one solely by the band and the other a duet featuring Japanese singer-songwriter Mari Hamada; the latter featured on Hamada's 1994 international release All My Heart.

Track listing
 Australian single
 "Fixing a Broken Heart" - 3:33
 "Glory of Burning" - 4:09
 "One Bad Dream" - 4:09

 International single
 "Fixing a Broken Heart" - 3:33
 "Whispers in the Dark" (Acoustic '93) - 4:44
 "Fixing a Broken Heart" (duet with Mari Hamada) - 3:33

Chart performance

Cover versions
A popular song in the Philippines, it has been covered by several local singers including Sabrina, Christian Bautista (on his album Just a Love Song... Christian Bautista Live!), Roselle Nava, and Martin Nievera.

References

External links
 "Fixing a Broken Heart" by Indecent Obsession"

1993 songs
1993 singles
Indecent Obsession songs
MCA Records singles
Pop ballads
Rock ballads